Unnamed EP is the fourth EP by Canadian grindcore band Fuck the Facts. The EP was released on vinyl on February 21, 2010, and digitally on February 28, 2010. The EP is limited to 500 copies on vinyl (400 on black, 100 on clear), and is also available as a digital download. In 2014 the band found some extra covers leftover from the vinyl, rather than throw them out they decided to burn the ep to CD-Rs and sell them via Facebook. Only 7 were made.

Track listing

Personnel
Topon Das – guitar
Mathieu Vilandré – drums, guitar
Mel Mongeon – vocals, artwork
Marc Bourgon – bass, vocals

Additional
Dave Sarazin – drum recording
Craig Boychuk – mixing
Alan Douches – mastering
Johnny Ibay – guest guitar solo ("Unnamed")
Matt Connell – guest vocals ("Doghead")

Recording
The drums were recorded on November 15, 2009, at Raven Street Studios by Dave Sarazin, while the band recorded the rest at Super Pro Studio in Gatineau between November 16 and 28. Craig Boychuk mixed the album at CB Audio, and Alan Douches mastered the album at West West Side in December.

References

2010 EPs
Fuck the Facts albums